The Bachchhgotri or Bajgoti Rajput is a Rajput community found in the state of Uttar Pradesh in India. They are a sub-group within the larger [Awadh] community of eastern Uttar Pradesh. Common surnames include [Pratap] and Kunwar.

Origin 

The [Bachchhgotri [Rajput]] claim descent from [Bachchharaj ji Chauhan] ,  one of the 24 branch of Chauhan Dynasty.

Present Circumstances 

The Bachgoti Rajput are found mainly in the districts of Sultanpur and Pratapgarh. They speak Awadhi and use the common words from Urdu. They were at one time substantial landowners, but with the carrying out of land reform by the government of India after independence in 1947, they lost many of their larger estates. The community are now small to medium-sized farmers, growing wheat, sorghum, pulses and sugar cane. They have no caste council or panchayat, although there are localized panchayats in their villages. Although the community did practice clan exogamy, this is no longer the case.

The sense of belonging to the Rajput community remains strong, with the Bachgoti Rajput still strongly identifying themselves with the wider Rajput community of Awadh, and often refer to themselves as simply Rajput. This is shown by the persistence in their marriages of Rajput customs, like bursting of fire crackers and sending specially made laddoos to  members. Many members of the community continue to serve in the armed forces of India, an activity traditionally associated with the Rajputs. spoke.

See also 

 Mandarkia

References 

Khanzada
Rajput clans
Muslim communities of India
Muslim communities of Uttar Pradesh
Social groups of Uttar Pradesh